Youthanize is the first full-length album by grindcore band The Color of Violence. It was released under Epitaph Records on April 7, 2009. The album was made purely for fun as guitarist and vocalist stated, "It may not be groundbreaking, and it may not sell any copies, but we tried to be ourselves and experiment, and we're all really happy with the way it turned out, so fuck it."

Track listing

Personnel 
Credits for Youthanize adapted from Allmusic.

Musicians 

The Color of Violence
Travis Richter – lead vocals, guitars, composer
Derek Bloom – drums, guitars, bass guitar, percussion, keyboards, synthesizers, programming, composer

Session musicians
Matt Mehana – composer, vocals on "Christina, Christina"
Matt Manning – bass guitar, additional vocals
Wes Borland – bass guitar
Josh Lasseter – backing vocals

Production 

Lee Dyess – production, mixing, engineering, tambourine
Dan Shike – mastering
Travis Richter – production
Derek Bloom – production
Nabil Moo – production
Nick Pritchard – artwork, design

Joey Antillion – composer
Chad Crews – composer
Matt Good – composer
Charles Thompson – composer
Jon Syverson – composer, drums
Joel Croan – composer, drums

References

2009 albums
Epitaph Records albums
The Color of Violence albums